Salvatore Cezar Pais is an American aerospace engineer and inventor, currently working for the United States Space Force. He formerly worked at the Naval Air Station Patuxent River. His patent applications on behalf of his employers have attracted international attention for their potential military and energy-producing applications, but also doubt about their feasibility, and speculation that they may be misinformation intended to mislead the United States' adversaries or a scam.

Education and doctoral research

Salvatore Pais received his advanced education at Case Western Reserve University in Ohio, graduating with an MS for a thesis titled "Design of an experiment for observation of thermocapillary convection phenomena in a simulated floating zone under microgravity conditions" in 1993.

Pais received his PhD in mechanical and aerospace engineering from Case Western in 1999 on the subject of "Bubble generation under reduced gravity conditions for both co-flow and cross-flow configurations" for which he endured a number of parabolic flights to produce a low-gravity environment. His doctoral advisers were Yasuhiro Kamotani and Simon Ostrach who had carried out spacelab experiments in low-gravity aboard the space shuttle STS-50 in 1992. Pais's research was sponsored by NASA.

Career

Pais works as a scientist, aerospace engineer, and inventor, at the United States Navy's Naval Air Station Patuxent River. His patent applications on behalf of his employers have attracted international attention for their futuristic-sounding technology and potential military and energy-producing applications, but have also led to speculation that they may be misinformation intended to mislead the United States' strategic adversaries about the direction of United States defense research.

Pais left the NAWCAD in June 2019 and moved to the US Navy's Strategic Systems Programs organization. He transferred to the U.S. Air Force in 2021.

His patent applications include:
 A "piezoelectricity-induced room temperature superconductor" with the function of enabling "the transmission of electrical power with no losses."(2017). The Institution of Engineering and Technology commented that no evidence was presented to show that the device worked and that the highest temperature superconductors so far created worked at around -70 °C.
 A "plasma compression fusion device" (2018), described by Popular Mechanics as a "compact nuclear fusion reactor" that "seemingly stretch[es] the limits of science."
 An "electromagnetic field generator and method to generate an electromagnetic field" (2015), the principal stated application of which is to deflect asteroids that may hit the Earth. The patent is assigned to the US Secretary of the Navy.
 A "craft using an inertial mass reduction device" (2016), one embodiment of which could be a high speed "hybrid aerospace/undersea craft" able to "engineer the fabric of our reality at the most fundamental level", the patent application for which was supported by the Naval Aviation Enterprise's chief technical officer on the grounds that the Chinese military were already developing similar technology.
 A "high frequency gravitational wave generator" that may be used "for advanced propulsion, asteroid disruption and/or deflection, and communications through solid objects."(2017).

Testing on the feasibility of a High Energy Electromagnetic Field Generator (HEEMFG) occurred from October 2016 to September 2019; at a total cost of $508,000 over three years. The vast majority of expenditure was on salaries. The "Pais Effect" could not be proven and no further research was conducted. Brett Tingley wrote for The Drive that "Despite every physicist we have spoken to over the better part of two years asserting that the "Pais Effect" has no scientific basis in reality and the patents related to it were filled with pseudo-scientific jargon, NAWCAD confirmed they were interested enough in the patents to spend more than a half-million dollars over three years developing experiments and equipment to test Pais' theories". Pais remained defiant regarding the veracity of his theories, in an email to The Drive he wrote that his work "culminates in the enablement of the Pais Effect...as far as the doubting SMEs [Subject Matter Experts] are concerned, my work shall be proven correct one fine day...".

It has been speculated that reconnaissance aircraft utilizing the technology behind Pais' patents may be responsible for the phenomena appearing in the Pentagon UFO videos. The Chief Technical Officer (CTO) of the Naval Aviation Enterprise, Dr. James Sheehy, personally wrote a letter to the primary patent examiner at the United States Patent and Trademark Office (USPTO) claiming that they needed expedited approval of the patent because China is already “investing significantly” in these aerospace technologies which sound eerily similar to the UFOs reported by U.S. Navy pilots in the now well-known encounters. This raises the question of whether China has been developing or even already flying craft utilizing similar advanced technologies.

Selected publications

Scientific literature

Patent literature

References

External links 

Living people
Year of birth missing (living people)
American aerospace engineers
American inventors
Case Western Reserve University alumni
21st-century American physicists
United States Air Force civilians
United States naval aviation